Cravagliana is a comune (municipality) in the Province of Vercelli in the Italian region Piedmont, located about  northeast of Turin and about  northwest of Vercelli.

Cravagliana borders the following municipalities: Balmuccia, Cervatto, Fobello, Rimella, Rossa, Sabbia, Valstrona, Varallo Sesia, and Vocca.

References

Cities and towns in Piedmont